Lifestart, a not for profit organisation and registered charity, provides early intervention and school age years inclusion support programs and supports to children and young people 0 – 24 years living with disability or developmental delay.

History 
Lifestart began in 1996 when eight families whose children attended the Macquarie University Early Intervention program decided to set up an Early Childhood Intervention service which would be a model of best practice in service provision and family support. They won a tender from the NSW state government which allowed them to set up a small service in Turramurra, and was later named the model program for the state of NSW. The service is now spread right across Sydney, covering Northern Sydney, Western Sydney (including the Hills District), Eastern and Inner Sydney, Southern Sydney (including Illawarra/Shoalhaven), South West Sydney (including Wollondilly/Southern Highlands) and Nepean Blue Mountains (including the Hawkesbury). Lifestart has been funded by the NSW Department of Ageing, Disability and Home Care, the NSW Department of Education and Training, and is now a registered NDIS provider.  Lifestart is a registered charity and relies on donations for some programs.

Services 
A Lifestart team can provide speech therapy, occupational therapy, physiotherapy, psychology, early intervention, social welfare, transition to school and high school, community inclusion and school support.

Services are provided within the home, the child’s school or daycare, at one of Lifestart’s centres, or within the community (e.g. supporting inclusion into a swimming program). One of the most important programs is Open Playgroup, a weekly playgroup where parents can meet together and support one another while their children are supported in play by trained staff. This playgroup is open to members of the community and families on the waiting list as well as Lifestart members.

Lifestart uses a key worker approach.  A key worker is the person you will see and talk to the most. A key worker is an early intervention professional and may be a speech pathologist, special educator, occupational therapist, social worker, physiotherapist or psychologist.

Locations 
Lifestart provides direct services in the following areas:
Inner and Eastern Sydney, Northern Sydney, Nepean, Blue Mountains (including Hawkesbury, Southern, Sydney (including Illawarra/Shoalhaven), South West Sydney (including Wollondilly/Southern Highlands), Western Sydney (including the Hills District).

Lifestart provides online therapy throughout Australia

References

External links 
Lifestart Official Site

Education in Sydney